Bambusa pallida is a type of bamboo.

References

pallida